MV Funchal is a Portuguese ocean liner owned by Brock Pierce as a floating hotel.

Construction and configuration

The ship was built in 1961, under the guidance of the Portuguese naval engineer Rogério d'Oliveira. Funchal is an ocean liner with a classic profile and interiors.

The ship's features include stabilisation, air-conditioning, three lifts, a main show lounge (Ilha Verde), piano bar (Porto Bar), club room, library, card room, lido bar, shop, photo shop, medical centre, excursion office, and reception with exchange facilities.

Early service
The ship was once owned by one of the wealthiest families in the Azores.

Service with Classic International Cruises

Funchal was the first vessel to join the Classic International Cruises fleet in 1984, and under that flag successfully served the British cruise market for over 20 years, carrying thousands of passengers.

Having undergone extensive work in 2010, to comply with SOLAS 2010, Funchal went back to a Lisbon Shipyard in February 2011 for a lengthy refit, which would include changes to its power plant as well as passenger and crew cabins and public lounges. The idea was to make the ship fit for service for at least another ten years. In November 2011, she completed 50 years of service, always under the same name. However, in 2012, work stopped towards April with only 20% of the required work completed. Following Classic International Cruises' liquidation, in December 2012, the ship faced the threat of being sold for scrap.

Service with Portuscale Cruises

In early 2013 a Portuguese entrepreneur Rui Alegre purchased Funchal, as well as Princess Danae, Arion and Athena, to serve the newly-formed Portuscale Cruises. During 2013, Funchal was extensively refurbished in Lisbon's Naval Rocha shipyards, being upgraded to a four-star vessel, at a cost of about 10 million euros. In the refurbishment, the ship's hull was re-painted black, its original colour.

On 1 August 2013, the refurbished Funchal was re-instated, in the presence of prime minister Passos Coelho. In early August 2013, the ship left drydock in Lisbon, Portugal and, on 27 August 2013, arrived in Gothenburg, Sweden, to restart her cruising career.

On 28 August 2013, the refurbished Funchal was detained at Gothenburg. The cruiseship was fully loaded with passengers but was not allowed to leave. According to some Swedish press accounts, many security issues were found. In a press release, the Portuscale Cruise CEO denied the existence of security issues, saying that the issues were related to the malfunctioning of two watertight doors and one sprinkler station, issues that had already been detected by the crew, who had informed the Swedish Port State Control authorities.

On 3 September 2013, with the issues resolved, and all inspections made and certifications granted, Funchal left Gothenburg harbour and restarted her cruise, heading to Scotland.

Signature Living
On 5 December 2018 Funchal was sold at auction in Lisbon for Euro€3.1 million. The buyers were named as Signature Living, a UK-based hotel group who intended to convert the ship to a party hotel to travel from Liverpool to the Mediterranean. However, payment was not made and ship continued laid up in Lisbon where future was uncertain. According to industry sources, the classic 1961-built Funchal was to be towed to Liverpool as soon as new owners Signature Living made the final payment on the vessel. However, on 30 June 2020 Signature Living entered administration with the administrators arranging for the disposal of Funchal. She thus remained moored in Lisbon.

Brock Pierce plans for hotel
In December 2020, Funchal was still laid up in Lisbon when put up for auction by sealed tender 
The purchaser, crypto-currency billionaire Brock Pierce, paid US$1.9 million/€1.6 million with refurbishing costs estimated to add at least US$6.4 million/€5.5 million to turn the boat into a 200-room, 5 star hotel at Yard Naval da Rocha Conde de Óbidos. Pierce also bought the 75 year-old Astoria, docked in Rotterdam, which was also to be transferred to Lisbon for refurbishing and naval certificates, with eventual plans to travel to Funchal, Madeira. After Docked for refurbishment as hotel,

Work appears to be slow and in September 2021 the ship was scene of a fire incident which resulted in 20 fire crews rushing to the scene. One worker suffered minor smoke inhalation injuries.

Footnotes

External links and further reading

 MarineTraffic: FUNCHAL - Current position of RV Funchal, recent port calls and live map view.
 MV Funchal ship profile - Portuscale Cruises profile for MV Funchal, showing deck plans and information about the public areas of the ship.
 ssMaritime: SS Funchal - Early history of SS Funchal.

1961 ships
Ships built in Helsingør
Cruise ships
Passenger ships of Portugal
Cruise ships of Portugal